Bi-Conicals of the Rammellzee is the second and final studio album by American graffiti artist and rapper Rammellzee. It was released on Gomma in 2004.

Critical reception
Chris Campion of The Observer gave the album 4 stars out of 5, saying: "As impenetrable as it is wildly entertaining, this record will fuel Rammellzee's reputation for at least another two decades."

In 2013, Spin included it on the "25 Best Albums by Rappers Over 40" list.

Track listing

Personnel
Credits adapted from liner notes.

 Rammellzee – vocals
 Ferris Wheel – production (1)
 K-Rob – vocals (2)
 Jaws – production (2, 5)
 Glammerlicious – mixing (2)
 Kerry Lach – vocals (3)
 Munk – production (3, 7, 9), mixing (4, 10), project coordination, final realization
 Mathias Modica – synthesizer bass (4)
 Stuart Argabright – production (4, 8), mixing (4, 8, 10)
 Shockdell – vocals (5)
 Stefano Rossi – mixing (5)
 Taketo – production (6)
 Paul Geluso – bass guitar (8), mixing (8)
 DJ Tim Sweeney – turntables (8)
 Shinichi Shimokawa – synthesizer guitar (8), drum programming (10), synthesizer bass (10)
 Michael Diekmann – guitar (10)
 Death Comet Crew – production (10)
 Celia Bullwinkel – vocals (11)
 Naughty – production (11)
 Chaos – production (11)

References

External links
 

2004 albums
Rammellzee albums